Building Energy is a vertical integrated renewable energy company that develops, engineers, constructs, and operates projects. The company employs approximately 200 full-time employees and owns a diversified portfolio of renewable assets within solar energy, energy storage, wind energy, biomass and hydropower.

History 
Building Energy was founded in 2010 in Milan, Italy. The company started a business in the solar industry, aiming to expand geographically and within diverse technologies. In June 2013, Building Energy closed an agreement with the private equity fund, Synergo SGR, which invested about €30m. Today, the fund holds 32% of the company's share capital, while the rest of the shares were distributed amongst the top management. Currently, the Building Energy Group has 200 employees, based in the offices in Milan, South Africa, United States, Serbia, Japan, United Arab Emirates and Panama.

Company presence

Africa 
Building Energy is present in Africa with an office located in Cape Town. In December 2011, the company was awarded a contract for the construction of an 81 MW photovoltaic project in the town of Kathu in the Northern Cape, which was the first large utility scale project ever built in Africa, and still now (2015-Q2) the largest photovoltaic solar farm on the continent. 
This project is part of the first round incentive program. The € 280m implementation and financing agreements were signed in November 2012 with the South African Department of Energy and the lender Rand Merchant Bank.
For this project, Building Energy worked as EPC and successfully completed the construction activities and commissioning in a year and a half (from January 2013 to August 2014). Today the company operates the solar farm and will manage it for a 20-year period.
In October 2017, "Tororo Solar North Limited', a special purpose vehicle company whose majority shareholder is Building Energy SpA, was commissioned the development of the Tororo Solar Power Station a 10 MW photovoltaic power station which will be constructed in the district of Tororo, Uganda. The cost of development is estimated to be around US$19.6mln.

Europe 
The pipeline of Building Energy in Europe consists of 18 hydroelectric and biomass projects under the development phase by the subsidiaries in Serbia and Croatia. Building Energy Balkan is working in Serbia to develop five hydroelectric plants, for a total power of 5 MWp, and 3 biomass plants with an electrical power of 4MW and a thermal power of 20 MW each. Building Energy Croatia took over the development of 10 biomass plants, composed of 5 plants of 5 MW and 5 plants of 2 MW each.

Italy 
In Italy, Building Energy has developed and built 15 photovoltaic projects, ground mounted and rooftops, with a total capacity of about 150 MW. The projects are mostly located in the provinces of Lazio, Lombardy, Emilia Romagna, Marche and in minor quantity in Sardinia and Sicily. The projects are monitored and managed by the Milan office.

United States and the Americas 
Building Energy is present in the United States with an office located in Washington, DC. In May 2013, the company signed a collaboration agreement with ABM, a NYSE-listed facility company. Building Energy designed and built a 1.2 MW photovoltaic plant in Baltimore, MD, one of the larger projects in the metropolitan area. The solar farm is connected to the Washington Gas Energy utility and produces 1.5 million KWh per year, serving both the local community, and the health care and assistance centres of the Glen Meadows Retirement Company. Building Energy, in partnership with ABM, designed and built the 2MW photovoltaic farm at the Cornell University, which was connected to the NYSEG utility in September 2014. All the energy produced by the solar plant is sold to the Cornell University, which owns the land where the facility was built.

In July 2017, regulators gave final approval for a solar energy park to be built in Anne Arundel County. Once the park is completed, it will be owned and operated by Building Energy.

Middle East and North Africa 
Building Energy is present in the Middle East with an office in Dubai, from where they also manage and coordinate the projects in North Africa. In Egypt, Building Energy is the lead member of a consortium which has been shortlisted for the development of a 20 MW photovoltaic project, to be built in Kom Ombo. In Jordan, the company has been selected to develop a 50 MW solar project in the north of the country, which is part of the second round of the renewable energy incentive program.

See also 
 Green economy

External links 
Company website

Italian companies established in 2010
Companies based in Milan